Dylan Carter may refer to:

 Dylan Carter (swimmer) (born 1996), Trinidad and Tobago swimmer
 Dylan Carter (Home and Away), a character on the soap opera Home and Away